The Dinh Hills (Núi Dinh) are hills that are located to the north west of Bà Rịa, in the Bà Rịa–Vũng Tàu province, Vietnam.

During the Vietnam War, the Dinh hills were a Viet Cong base area which fought against the 1st Australian Task Force.

The Dinh Hills are located to the west of the Phuoc Tuy province, an area known primarily for its rich farmland; in addition to the Hac Dich, May Tao, and Long Son base camps, these particular hills were initially used in Vietnam's nationalist wars against France.

Recent years, Núi Dinh is the great place for training athletic in the south of Vietnam due to there is a nice road to the central of the Núi Dinh with a suitable slopes for people to training run or cycling.

Moreover the nature of Dinh Hills is great, it still reserve the nature of the forest. So there are some trekking routes in Dinh Hills suitable for the beginning trekker or children to enjoy the trekking Núi Dinh

Citations

References
Rowe, John. Vietnam: the Australian experience (Sydney: Time–Life Books Australia and John Ferguson, 1987) 
https://www.anbuiphotography.com/2022/08/dinh-hills-nui-dinh-ideal-place-to-back.html

Hills of Vietnam
Landforms of Bà Rịa-Vũng Tàu province